State Route 856 (SR 856) is a state highway in Pershing County, Nevada serving Lovelock.  The western portion of the route is also signed as Interstate 80 Business.

Route description
State Route 856 begins as a continuation of Cornell Avenue (I-80 Bus.) at the intersection of Upper Valley Road (State Route 396) and 14th Street in northwestern Lovelock.  The highway heads northeast as Airport Road, crossing over Upper Valley Road, an irrigation canal, and the Union Pacific Railroad tracks towards a half-interchange with Interstate 80 and U.S. Route 95.  The route then continues east, crossing the Humboldt River and passing south of the now-abandoned Lovelock Airpark, reaching its terminus near the intersection of Reservoir Road.

Cornell Avenue, as a historic routing of U.S. Route 40–95, is designated as Interstate 80 Business through Lovelock.  SR 856 carries the business loop from the northern end of Lovelock back to I-80, since Cornell Avenue does not intersect the interstate.

History
Airport Road appears on maps as early as 1954, although it was not assigned a state highway number at the time.  The road was assigned to State Route 856 on July 1, 1976.

Major intersections

See also

References

856
Transportation in Pershing County, Nevada